The Men's team foil event took place on November 11, 2010 at Grand Palais.

Foil team

References

External links
Bracket

2010 World Fencing Championships